"Pretty Lady" is a song by Australian alternative artist Tash Sultana, released on 9 April 2020. It was released through Lonely Lands Records and Sony Music Australia as the lead single from Sultana's second studio album, Terra Firma (2021).

At the 2020 ARIA Music Awards, the song was nominated for Best Soul/R&B Release.

The song was nominated for Most Performed Blues and Roots Work at the APRA Music Awards of 2021

The song won Best Single at the 2021 Rolling Stone Australia Awards.

Background and release 
On 8 April, Sultana announced via social media that their first single for 2020, "Pretty Lady" was being released the next day, with a premiere on triple j Breakfast to come.

The following day, 9 April, triple j Breakfast premiered "Pretty Lady", with the track being released immediately following.

Live performances 
Sultana performed the single live for the first time on 9 April 2020, performing an internet live streamed concert on YouTube.

Music video 
Sultana released the music video for "Pretty Lady" the day the single was released.

Credits and personnel 
 Tash Sultana – producer, songwriter
 Matt Corby – songwriter
 Dann Hume – songwriter

Charts

Certifications

References

Tash Sultana songs
2020 singles
2020 songs
Songs written by Dann Hume